Michael Sevald Præstrup Aamodt (1784–1859) was a Norwegian politician.

He was elected to the Norwegian Parliament in 1824, representing the rural constituency of Lister og Mandals Amt (today named Vest-Agder). He sat through only one term.

Hailing from Øye in Kvinesdal, he worked as a goldsmith and vaccinator. He died in 1859.

References

1784 births
1859 deaths
Members of the Storting
Vest-Agder politicians
People from Kvinesdal